Noora Ruskola (born 21 December 1994) is a Finnish sailor. She and Camilla Cedercreutz placed 17th in the 49erFX event at the 2016 Summer Olympics.

References

1994 births
Living people
Finnish female sailors (sport)
Olympic sailors of Finland
Sailors at the 2016 Summer Olympics – 49er FX